Henrik Purienne is a South African photographer, film director, and founder of fashion publication Mirage. He is based in Cape Town.

Early life
Purienne was born in Worcester, South Africa.

Work 
Purienne began his career making documentary films.

He has created advertising campaigns and editorials for the brands Louis Vuitton, Maison Kitsuné, American Apparel, Maison Margiela, Interview Magazine, Playboy, Vogue, Lui, and Purple often featuring contemporary 'it girls' such as Sky Ferreira, Emily Ratajkowski, Camille Rowe, and Aymeline Valade.

In 2009 he launched the fashion and culture publication Mirage.

Bibliography

Awards
 2012: D&AD Yellow Pencil, Professional Awards category, for commercial film / campaign directed by Purienne, titled 'MK is...', for South African music television channel MK

References

Sources
 Paper Journal – Interview Henrik Purienne
 10and5 – Henrik Purienne
 Discover and Escape – Purienne
 La Canvas – Pure pleasure Henrik Purienne

External links
 Mirage Magazine

Fashion photographers
South African photographers
South African documentary film directors
People from Worcester, South Africa
1977 births
Living people